The 2nd District of the Alabama Senate is currently represented by Tom Butler (Republican).

Communities
The district includes portions of Limestone and Madison counties. Communities contained at least partially within the district include the following:

Cities
Athens
Huntsville
Madison

Unincorporated places
Harvest
Redstone Arsenal

References

02